The Men's 25 km Open Water event at the 2007 World Aquatics Championships was held on 25 March 2007 at St Kilda beach.

Result

World Aquatics Championships
Open water swimming at the 2007 World Aquatics Championships